Jake Billy Doyle-Hayes (born 30 December 1998) is an Irish professional footballer who plays as a midfielder for Scottish club Hibernian. He has represented Ireland as a youth international. Doyle-Hayes is a product of the Aston Villa Academy and spent six years at the club, making appearances in the Football League Cup in 2017 and 2018 before loan spells at Cambridge United and Cheltenham Town, he left Villa in June 2020. After a season with St Mirren, he signed for Hibernian in June 2021.

Club career

Aston Villa 
In his early teens, he was spotted by scouts while playing for Cavan-Monaghan, a regional representative side. There was interest from Manchester United and Chelsea but he ultimately chose Aston Villa where former Ireland captain Roy Keane was the assistant manager. Doyle-Hayes made his debut for Aston Villa in the League Cup on 22 August 2017, starting the match in midfield in a 4-1 victory over Wigan Athletic.

On 5 September 2017 Doyle-Hayes agreed a new three-year contract with the club.

On 31 January 2019, Doyle-Hayes joined Cambridge United on a 6-month loan. However, he struggled to cement a place in the first team due to injury and international call-ups and only made 6 appearances.

On 1 August 2019, Doyle-Hayes joined EFL League Two side Cheltenham Town on a season-long loan. He impressed Cheltenham fans immediately, and was voted player of the month for August. Doyle-Hayes scored his first ever goal at senior level on 17 September 2019, in a 3-2 victory over Bradford City. 

On 25 June 2020, Doyle-Hayes was released by Aston Villa.

St Mirren 
On 3 November 2020, Doyle-Hayes signed a short-term contract with Scottish Premiership side St Mirren, due to last until the end of the 2020–21 season. Doyle-Hayes explained that while he had had "a lot of interest" since leaving Aston Villa, the opportunity to work with manager Jim Goodwin excited him the most.

Doyle-Hayes made his debut on 6 November 2020, in a 0-0 draw in the Scottish Premiership against Dundee United. Doyle-Hayes scored his first goal in the Scottish Premiership on 22 November 2020, in a 1–0 victory at Livingston. He made 30 appearances in total for St Mirren, before choosing to leave the club at the end of his contract.

Hibernian 
Doyle-Hayes signed a two-year contract with Hibernian in June 2021. On 19 February 2022, Doyle-Hayes scored both goals in Hibernian’s 2–0 win over Ross County in the Scottish Premiership. Hibs accepted an offer from Forest Green Rovers for Doyle-Hayes in December 2022, but he rejected that proposal.

Career statistics

Honours 
Aston Villa U23s

 Premier League Cup: 2018–19

References

External links

1998 births
Living people
Aston Villa F.C. players
Cambridge United F.C. players
Cheltenham Town F.C. players
St Mirren F.C. players
Scottish Professional Football League players
English Football League players
Republic of Ireland association footballers
Sportspeople from County Cavan
Association football midfielders
People from Ballyjamesduff
Hibernian F.C. players